The Trumpchi GS8 is a mid-size crossover SUV produced by GAC Group under the Trumpchi brand in China and the GAC Motor brand globally.

The first generation was launched in 2016, and spawned a slightly smaller 5-seater variant dubbed the Trumpchi GS7. The Trumpchi GS7 received a facelift in April 2020 and was renamed the Trumpchi GS8S. The second generation GS8 was unveiled in 2021 with a longer, wider with a longer wheelbase compared to the first generation model.

First generation

Designed by former Mercedes-Benz designer Fan Zhang, it debuted at the 2016 Beijing Auto Show as Trumpchi's largest vehicle in its product lineup and later at the Detroit Auto Show. 

The full designation of the GS8 is Trumpchi GS8 320T. Pricing starts at 163,800 yuan and ends at 259,800 yuan ($24,200 – 38,000).

Overseas markets
GAC Group launched their GAC Motor brand and the GS8 SUV, in Russia, on December 9, 2019. 

In Lebanon it is sold by Bazerji Motors Sal and comes with 2.0 engine and 4WD and back up camera and parking sensor.

GAC Group was initially slated to launch the GS8 in the United States by late 2019, but, announced delays to their sales plans to the first half of 2020, during the 2019 Detroit Auto Show. On May 22, 2019, due to the worsening China-US trade tensions, the parent company of Trumpchi brand: Guangzhou Automobile Group Co., decided to indefinitely postpone their US market plans.

Trumpchi GS8S
The Trumpchi GS8S was launched in April 2020. Essentially a facelifted GS7, the GS8S sits slightly below the regular GS8 as a 5-Seater Trumpchi GS8.

Second generation

The second generation GS8 was unveiled in July 2021. A hybrid version powered by a 2.0 litre engine is also available with Toyota-sourced THS.

See also
 List of GAC vehicles

References

External links

 
 (Global)

GS8
Cars introduced in 2016
2020s cars
Mid-size sport utility vehicles
Crossover sport utility vehicles
Front-wheel-drive vehicles
All-wheel-drive vehicles
Cars of China